Socrates, his two Wives, and Alcibiades is a large oil on canvas painting by the Dutch Golden Age artist, Reyer van Blommendael. It is today owned by the Musée des Beaux-Arts of Strasbourg, France. Its inventory number is 1377.

The painting was bought in 1934 in Paris as a work by Jan Victors, and was later attributed to Cesar van Everdingen. Only in 1997 has the art historian Eddy de Jongh attributed the painting with certainty to Bloemmendael. Other paintings by Blommendael, especially Loth and his Daughters (Musée des Beaux-Arts of Dunkirk), show exactly the same, distinctive type of blonde, round-faced, small-eyed and full-breasted young woman as Socrates, his two Wives, and Alcibiades.

The bigamist Socrates is depicted as so absorbed by his thoughts that he remains ignorant of Myrto's erotic enticement as well as of Xanthippe dousing him with cold water. Only young Alcibiades, arriving from the left, is about to waken the philosopher from his stupor. Socrates is leaning on a stone with the inscription "Know thyself".

References 

Paintings in the collection of the Musée des Beaux-Arts de Strasbourg
1660s paintings
Cultural depictions of Socrates
Dutch Golden Age paintings